Datu Piang, officially the Municipality of Datu Piang (Maguindanaon: Inged nu Datu Piang), is a 2nd class municipality in the province of Maguindanao del Sur, Philippines. According to the 2020 census, it has a population of 28,380 people.

It is formerly known as Dulawan.

History

Created as Dulawan on November 25, 1936, by Executive Order No. 66 of Pres. Manuel L. Quezon, the municipality covered a large area of what is now mostly central Maguindanao and northern Sultan Kudarat. It is among the first municipalities of the old Cotabato province. Republic Act No. 1035, enacted on June 12, 1954, renamed the town to Datu Piang, after an influential Muslim leader from the region during the American colonial period.

In 1959, a large southern territory was made into the municipality of Ampatuan. Four years later the municipality of Maganoy was carved out its territory, which later on became the capital of Maguindanao, of which it was made part of on November 22, 1973. Its remaining south-western barangays were merged with other barangays of Dinaig to form the municipality of Talayan in 1976. Its area was reduced again on July 1, 2003, when 14 of its south-eastern barangays were separated to form the municipality of Datu Saudi-Ampatuan.

On July 30, 2009, upon the ratification of Muslim Mindanao Autonomy Acts No. 225 (as amended by MMAA 252) and MMAA 222 (as amended by MMAA 253), the municipalities of Shariff Saydona Mustapha and Datu Salibo, respectively, were created from a total of 5 entire barangays and portions of 10 barangays from Datu Piang, in addition to other barangays from Datu Saudi-Ampatuan, Datu Unsay, Mamasapano and Shariff Aguak.

On December 3, 2020, at around 10:45 in the evening, around 100 members of the Bangsamoro Islamic Freedom Fighters (BIFF) attacked and assaulted three Philippine Army detachments in the municipality. The firefight lasted for about an hour and a grenade was thrown at a police car which caught fire and exploded. There were no reported civilian and military casualties. On December 11, the Philippine National Police filed complaints for multiple frustrated murder and destructive arson against more than a hundred BIFF leaders and members responsible for the attack.

Geography

Barangays
Datu Piang is politically subdivided into 16 barangays.

 Alonganan 
 Ambadao
 Balanakan 
 Balong
 Buayan (Rajahbuayan Mopakc)
 Dado 
 Damabalas 
 Duaminanga 
 Kalipapa (Mopak)
 Kanguan
 Liong 
 Magaslong 
 Masigay 
 Montay
 Poblacion (Dulawan)
 Reina Regente

Climate

Demographics

Economy

See also
List of renamed cities and municipalities in the Philippines

Notes

References

External links
 Datu Piang Profile at the DTI Cities and Municipalities Competitive Index
 [ Philippine Standard Geographic Code]
 Local Governance Performance Management System

Municipalities of Maguindanao del Sur
Populated places on the Rio Grande de Mindanao
Establishments by Philippine executive order